Claude Pruneau (born November 9, 1960) is a Canadian-American experimental high-energy nuclear physicist. He is a Professor of Physics at Wayne State University and the author of several books. He is best known for his work on particle correlation measurements in heavy ion collisions at the Relativistic Heavy Ion Collider and the Large Hadron Collider.

Career
Pruneau is a French Canadian native born in Quebec City. He completed his studies at Universite Laval where he earned a Ph.D. in Physics in 1987. He worked as Research Fellow successively for the Atomic Energy of Canada Limited and McGill University (Montreal). He joined the Wayne State University Faculty in 1992 where he is now Professor.  He conducts an active research program on the search and study of the Quark Gluon Plasma at the Brookhaven National Laboratory.  Pruneau is also visiting professor at the Mumbai Indian Institute of Technology (IIT).  
Pruneau is a member of the American Physical Society, the Canadian Association of Physicists, and the Union of Concerned Scientists. He enjoys teaching at both the Graduate and Undergraduate levels, as well as offering lectures for the larger public.
Pruneau was acting director of the Wayne State Planetarium. In this capacity, he delivered numerous public lectures on various scientific topics, including the extinction of dinosaurs, the production and use of energy, and the study of the quark gluon plasma, including a TedX talk.

One of Pruneau's best known scientific contribution is the analysis and interpretation of two and three particle correlations produced in  heavy ion collisions towards the understanding of the dynamics and chemistry of the QCD matter produced in these collisions.   Pruneau played a leading role in the development of two and three particle correlation function measurements to identify signatures of the formation of Quark Gluon Plasma in ultra-high energy heavy-ion collisions. 
Additionally, within the context of the STAR collaboration, Pruneau lead the design, development, and deployment of event reconstruction software to transform raw data produced by the experiment into kinematical quantities suitable for physics analysis of the heavy-ion collisions studied by the collaboration.

Pruneau participated to several experiments at the Brookaven National Laboratory (BNL) Alternating Gradient Synchrotron (AGS), including experiments E814, E877, and E864 that were among the first collaborations  to  explore the possibility of producing Quark Gluon Plasma matter in heavy ion collisions at AGS beam energies. In the last two decades, Pruneau focussed his efforts on the STAR experiment at the BNL Relativistic Heavy Ion Collider (RHIC) and at the CERN Large Hadron Collider. In STAR in contributed to the experiment's online system and later lead the team that created the track reconstruction software used by members of the collaboration to transform raw detector data into kinematical quantities suitable for physics analysis of the heavy-ion collisions studied by the collaboration.  Pruneau is best known for his scientific contributions towards  the analysis and interpretation of two and three particle correlations produced in heavy ion collisions and  towards the understanding of the dynamics and chemistry of the QCD matter produced in these collisions.

His recent work include studies of transverse momentum dependent two particle correlators designed to determine the shear viscosity of the quark gluon plasma produced in heavy-ion collisions at RHIC and LHC.

Pruneau is best known for his scientific contributions towards  the analysis and interpretation of two and three particle correlations produced in heavy ion collisions and  towards the understanding of the dynamics and chemistry of the QCD matter produced in these collisions.

Book
Pruneau is the author of the textbook Data Analysis Techniques for Physical Scientists (2017).

Awards and honors
2019 Wayne State University Board of Governors Faculty Recognition Award
2009 Wayne State University Department of Physics' Richard J Barber Faculty Award
2006 Wayne State University President's Award for Excellence in Teaching

References

External links
 Claude Pruneau's publications indexed by INSPIRE-HEP

Université Laval alumni
21st-century American physicists
Wayne State University faculty
Living people
1960 births
People associated with CERN
Scientists from Quebec
People from Quebec City
Canadian emigrants to the United States
21st-century Canadian physicists
American nuclear physicists
Canadian nuclear physicists